Shimogia fasciata is a species of beetles in the family Buprestidae, the only species in the genus Shimogia.

References

Monotypic Buprestidae genera